Cockle Creek may refer to:

 Cockle Creek (Tasmania), in Australia
 Cockle Creek (Virginia), in the United States
 Cockle Creek railway station, in Boolaroo, New South Wales, Australia
 Battle of Cockle Creek, during the American Civil War